Books by or about Jamaicans.

Books 
James, Marlon (2015), A brief history of seven killings 
Braham, Jonathan (2014), "The Pink House at Appleton". 
Barrett, Brenda (2010), "Di Taxi Ride and Other Stories". Jamaica Treasures. 
Barrett, Lindsay (1967), Song for Mumu. London: Longmans.
Brodber, Erna (1980). Jane and Louisa Will Soon Come Home. New Beacon Books. 
Brodber, Erna (1988), Myal. New Beacon Books. 
Cliff, Michelle (1987), No Telephone to Heaven. Vintage International. 
Evans, Hayacinth (2001). Inside Jamaican Schools. University of West Indies Press. 
Goodison, Lorna (2008), From Harvey River
Graham, George (2007), "Hill-an'-Gully Rider," Lulu. 
Graham, George (2007), "Girlie," Lulu. 
Mais, Roger (1953), The Hills Were Joyful Together
Mais, Roger (1954), Brother Man
Manley, Rachel (1997), Drumblair: Memories of a Jamaican Childhood. Kingston: Ian Randle, 1996 
Miller, Kei (2008), The Same Earth. London: Weidenfeld & Nicolson
Miller. Keil (2010), The Last Warner Woman. London: Weidenfeld & Nicolson
 Parker, Samuel J, (2013) "Red Snapper". Amazon 978-0-9572621-0-2
Reid, V. S. (1949), New Day
Reid, V. S. (1958), The Leopard
Richards, Leopold Anthony (2021), "Jamaican Folk Talk". Amazon. ISBN 
Salkey, Andrew (1959), A Quality of Violence
Salkey, Andrew (1960), Escape to an Autumn Pavement
Salkey, Andrew (1968), The Late Emancipation of Jerry Stover. 
Salkey, Andrew (1974), Joey Tyson.  
Salkey, Andrew (1976), Come Home, Malcolm Heartland
Thompson, Herbert J. (2002), JAMAICA Rebuilding the walls. Northern Caribbean University. 
Wynter, Sylvia (1962), The Hills of Hebron

See also 
 Jamaican literature.

References 

Lists of books

Books